The 2009 Generali Ladies Linz was a tennis tournament played on indoor hard courts. It was the 23rd edition of the Generali Ladies Linz, and was part of the WTA International tournaments of the 2009 WTA Tour. It was held at the TipsArena Linz in Linz, Austria, from October 10 through October 18, 2009.

WTA players

Seeds 

 Seeds are based on the rankings of October 5, 2009

Other entrants
The following players received wildcards into the singles main draw:
  Patricia Mayr
  Yvonne Meusburger 
  Yanina Wickmayer

The following players received entry from the qualifying draw:
  Stephanie Gehrlein
  Julia Görges
  Petra Martić
  Aravane Rezaï

Champions

Singles

 Yanina Wickmayer def.  Petra Kvitová, 6-3, 6-4
It was Wickmayer's second title of the year and career.

Doubles

 Anna-Lena Grönefeld /  Katarina Srebotnik def.  Klaudia Jans /  Alicja Rosolska, 6-1, 6-4

External links
Official website

Generali Ladies Linz
2009
Generali Ladies Linz
Generali Ladies Linz
Generali